The AQA Baccalaureate (known as the "AQA Bacc" for short) is a British educational qualification launched in April 2009 and managed by Charlotte Christie  for the Assessment and Qualifications Alliance, or AQA, to be studied in Years 12 and 13. The qualification includes the existing A and AS Levels as part of the assessment, as well as mandatory enrichment activities and an extended project.

Sections
Three GCE A Levels of the student's choice
Minimum of AS Level in General Studies, Critical Thinking or Citizenship
Extended Project Qualification (EPQ)
Enrichment: minimum of 100 hours in at least two of:
work-related learning
community participation
personal development activities

References

Educational qualifications in the United Kingdom